Emmerson Serrano Oreta (born March 28, 1980) is a Filipino former professional basketball player. Oreta currently serves as the Head of Operations for the Maharlika Pilipinas Basketball League (MPBL). He was undrafted in the 2005 PBA draft.

Collegiate career
Oreta played for the UST Growling Tigers in the UAAP. In his final season with the team, he averaged 11.4 points and 4.3 rebounds per game. In addition, he was also the team captain of the team.

Professional career
In 2003, Oreta played for the John-O basketball team in the semi-professional Philippine Basketball League (PBL), but a couple of months later joined the Sunkist–UST Tigers team, the PBL affiliate of his collegiate team, the UST Growling Tigers.

In 2008, Oreta joined the Smart-Pampanga Buddies of the semi-professional Liga Pilipinas and stayed there until 2009 when the team folded.

In 2010, Oreta finally got his first taste of action in the PBA after the Talk 'N Text Tropang Texters signed him from free agency.
He won 4 PBA titles with the team.

In 2015, Oreta joined the tryouts held by a new team, the Pilipinas Aguilas along with many other hopeful veterans unable to make it to the PBA. A couple of weeks later, it was confirmed that Oreta will be a part of the final lineup of the Aguilas. However, in December 2015, Oreta, along with Sunday Salvacion, Charles Mammie, Chad Alonzo, Jondan Salvador, and Adrian Celada were released by the Pilipinas MX3 Kings after a roster overhaul.

In 2018, Oreta played for the Department of Agriculture Food Masters in the UNTV Cup. He was hailed the Best Player of the Game one time.

International career
He was part of the Philippine squad that won the 2003 Southeast Asian Games basketball tournament and the 2003 SEABA Championship.

PBA career statistics

Correct as of September 1, 2015

Season-by-season averages

|-
| align=left | 
| align=left | Talk 'N Text
| 18 || 2.7 || .381 || .429 || .625 || .5 || .4 || .0 || .0 || 1.3
|-
| align=left | 
| align=left | Talk 'N Text
| 5 || 7.0 || .357 || .333 || .500 || 1.2 || .4 || .0 || .0 || 3.8
|-
| align=left | Career
| align=left |
| 23 || 3.7 || .371 || .375 || .550 || .7 || .4 || .0 || .0 || 1.9

References

External links
 Player Profile at Asia-Basket
 Player Profile at PBA-Online!

 
 
 
 

1980 births
Living people
ASEAN Basketball League players
Point guards
Philippines men's national basketball team players
Filipino men's basketball players
Shooting guards
Basketball players from Manila
TNT Tropang Giga players
UST Growling Tigers basketball players
Southeast Asian Games medalists in basketball
Southeast Asian Games gold medalists for the Philippines
Southeast Asian Games competitors for the Philippines
Competitors at the 2003 Southeast Asian Games